The Minister of Human Capacities of Hungary is a member of the Hungarian cabinet and the head of the Ministry of Human Capacities. The current minister of human capacities is Miklós Kásler.

This page is a list of Ministers of Education of Hungary.

Minister of Education (1848)

Hungarian Kingdom (1848)
Parties

Ministers of Religion and Public Education (1848–1919)

Hungarian Kingdom (1848–1849)
Parties

Hungarian State (1849)
Parties

After the collapse of the Hungarian Revolution of 1848, the Hungarian Kingdom became an integral part of the Austrian Empire until 1867, when dual Austro-Hungarian Monarchy was created.

Hungarian Kingdom (1867–1918)
Parties

Hungarian People's Republic (1918–1919)
Parties

Minister of Religion (1919)

Hungarian People's Republic (1919)
Parties

Minister of Public Education (1919)

Hungarian People's Republic (1919)
Parties

People's Commissars of Public Education (1919)

Hungarian Soviet Republic (1919)
Parties

Counter-revolutionary governments (1919)
Parties

Ministers of Religion and Public Education (1919–1951)

Hungarian People's Republic (1919)
Parties

Hungarian Republic (1919–1920)
Parties

Hungarian Kingdom (1920–1946)
Parties

Government of National Unity (1944–1945)
Parties

Soviet-backed provisional governments (1944–1946)
Parties

Hungarian Republic (1946–1949)
Parties

Hungarian People's Republic (1949–1951)
Parties

Ministers of Public Education (1951–1953)

Hungarian People's Republic (1951–1953)
Parties

Minister of Higher Education (1952–1953)

Hungarian People's Republic (1952–1953)
Parties

Ministers of Education (1953–1956)

Hungarian People's Republic (1953–1956)
Parties

Ministers of Popular Culture (1949–1956)

Hungarian Republic (1949)
Parties

Hungarian People's Republic (1949–1956)
Parties

Ministers of Cultural Affairs (1957–1974)

Hungarian People's Republic (1957–1974)
Parties

Ministers of Education (1974–1980)

Hungarian People's Republic (1974–1980)
Parties

Ministers of Culture (1974–1980)

Hungarian People's Republic (1974–1980)
Parties

Ministers of Cultural Affairs (1980–1990)

Hungarian People's Republic (1980–1989)
Parties

Hungarian Republic (1989–1990)
Parties

Ministers of Culture and Public Education (1990–1998)

Hungarian Republic (1990–1998)
Parties

Minister of Education (1998–2006)

Hungarian Republic (1998–2006)
Parties

Ministers of National Cultural Heritage (1998–2006)

Hungarian Republic (1998–2006)
Parties

Minister of Education and Culture (2006–2010)

Hungarian Republic (2006–2010)
Parties

Minister of National Resources (2010–2012)

Hungarian Republic / Hungary (2010–2012)
Parties

Ministers of Human Resources (2012–present)

Hungary (2012–present)
Parties

See also
List of heads of state of Hungary
List of prime ministers of Hungary
List of Ministers of Agriculture of Hungary
List of Ministers of Civilian Intelligence Services of Hungary
List of Ministers of Croatian Affairs of Hungary
List of Ministers of Defence of Hungary
List of Ministers of Finance of Hungary
List of Ministers of Foreign Affairs of Hungary
List of Ministers of Interior of Hungary
List of Ministers of Justice of Hungary
List of Ministers of Public Works and Transport of Hungary
Politics of Hungary

Education Ministers
 
 
Ministers